Impact of Event Scale - Revised (IES-R) is a 22-item self-report measure that assesses subjective distress caused by traumatic events. The 15-item IES is the original scale, but is missing hyperarousal symptom. It is a revised version of the older version, the 15-item IES. The IES-R contains seven additional items related to the hyperarousal symptoms of PTSD, which were not included in the original IES. Items correspond directly to 14 of the 17 DSM-IV symptoms of PTSD. Respondents are asked to identify a specific stressful life event and then indicate how much they were distressed or bothered during the past seven days by each "difficulty" listed. The scale shows good measurement invariance as a one factor scale with both latino and non-latino populations.

Items are rated on a 5-point scale ranging from 0 ("not at all") to 4 ("extremely"). The IES-R yields a total score (ranging from 0 to 88) and subscale scores can also be calculated for the Intrusion, Avoidance, and Hyperarousal subscales. The authors recommend using means instead of raw sums for each of these subscales scores to allow comparison with scores from the Symptom Checklist 90 - Revised (SCL-90-R; Derogatis, 1994). In general, the IES-R (and IES) is not used to diagnosis PTSD, however, cutoff scores for a preliminary diagnosis of PTSD have been cited in the literature.

An example question is: "Any reminders brought back feelings about it." (Respondents rate their degree of distress during the past seven days.)

References 

Mental disorders screening and assessment tools
Stress-related disorders
Wikipedia neurology articles ready to translate